The Chitte Building is an apartment building on the Upper West Side of Manhattan, New York City. Located at 349 Amsterdam Avenue between West 76th and 77th Streets, this five floor walk-up has twelve apartments and ground floor commercial space once occupied by the sports bar Time Out. In the early 1980s, the playwright and actor, Anna Deavere Smith was a tenant in the building.

The building was built in 1873-1874 by Brescoll & Palestine Construction Co.

References

Apartment buildings in New York City
Upper West Side
Residential buildings completed in 1874